Solfjellsjøen or Solfjellsjyen is the administrative centre of the municipality of Dønna in Nordland county, Norway. The village is located on the west-central part of the island of Dønna. There is a ferry connection from Solfjellsjøen to the nearby island of Vandve to the west.

Solfjellsjøen is also the home of the politician Odd-Harald Vistnes Forsland.

References

Dønna
Villages in Nordland